The Big Dig was a collection of various civil engineering projects in Liverpool to regenerate the city.

The scheme was a ten-year plan for the city's 2008 European Capital of Culture status. The city gained a new shopping centre Liverpool One. It cost around £3bn and created 14,000 jobs and included a rationalisation of the city centre traffic network.

Criticism
Implementation of the scheme was protracted and severely hampered the ability of the city to perform as a commercial centre. The cancellation of the 2007 Mathew Street Festival was directly attributed to the 'big dig'.

References

External links 
 https://web.archive.org/web/20070102225755/http://www.bigdig.liverpool.gov.uk/

Buildings and structures in Liverpool
Liverpool
Transport in Liverpool